The Russian Volunteer Corps (RVC) is a paramilitary unit known for claiming responsibility for an attack in Bryansk Oblast in 2023. The Russian government claimed that the group carried out a cross-border terrorist attack, killing two civilians. The Ukrainian government denied involvement, calling it either a false-flag operation or an internal struggle.

The unit announced its creation in August 2022 as consisting of Russian volunteers fighting for Ukraine during the Russian invasion of Ukraine. Its members have been variously described as right-wing or far-right. The group claims to be a part of Ukraine's armed forces, but Ukrainian officials have called it "independent".

Origin and aims
The Russian Volunteer Corps was founded in August 2022. Its founder is Denis Kapustin, also known as Denis Nikitin, a Russian neo-Nazi football hooligan. He lived in Germany from 2001 for several years. He later returned to Russia and founded the neo-Nazi clothing brand White Rex in 2008. In 2017, he moved to Ukraine.

It announced its formation with a statement on its newly-created Telegram channel: "We Russian volunteers living in Ukraine have decided to take up arms and create a military formation — the Russian Volunteer Corps — so that together with our Ukrainian comrades-in-arms, we can defend their homeland, which shelters us, and then continue the fight against Putin's criminal regime".

Nikitin said that the RVC consists of ethnic Russians fighting for Ukraine against Russia's invasion. He explained that Russian nationalism "has turned completely the wrong way" and posted a video urging white nationalists to fight Putin because Russia had turned into a police state. Nikitin spoke negatively about Ukrainian President Volodymyr Zelenskyy because he is Jewish and "promotes the worst of liberal values", but said Putin is worse. In October 2022, it published its manifesto, identifying itself as "part of Ukraine's Armed Forces", but Ukrainian officials did not comment on this. 

According to Glavcom it was formed by Russian volunteers who had started fighting for Ukraine in the Azov Regiment and other units in 2014. According to Vot Tak, unlike the Freedom of Russia Legion, the leadership of the corps does not rely on former Russian servicemen who ended up in the "Legion" after being taken prisoner, but on Russian right-wing emigrants living in Ukraine. According to Vot Tak, one of the commanders said the fighters of the Corps are "right-wing conservative". They use the symbols of the Russian Liberation Army, which collaborated with Nazi Germany during World War II.

Relation to other Russian armed opposition
According to Gordonua.com, the RVC was part of press conference on 31 August 2022 with the Freedom of Russia Legion and the National Republican Army. Ilya Ponomarev—political head of the National Republican Army—signed an agreement on political co-operation with the Freedom of Russia Legion, and claimed the Russian Volunteer Corps  also agreed to join the agreement. However, Meduza reports that the RVC does not collaborate with the Freedom of Russia Legion due to "ideological differences".

2023 Bryansk Oblast attack

On 2 March 2023, the Russian authorities claimed that an armed Ukrainian group crossed the border and carried out a "terrorist attack" in the villages of Lyubechane and Sushany, in Bryansk Oblast. Russia said the attackers fired on a car, killing two civilians, before the Federal Security Service forced them back into Ukraine.  On 9 March, Russia launched a barrage of missile strikes at Ukrainian civilian infrastructure in what it called "retaliation" for the attack. The Russian Volunteer Corps claimed responsibility for the alleged cross-border raid, and posted videos of armed men in Lyubechane with their insignia, urging Russians to "rise up and fight" against the government. They claimed to have attacked Russian military vehicles rather than civilians. Nikitin claimed the attack was agreed upon with Ukrainian authorities. He said the goal was to "remind Russians that you don't have to live in shackles, put up with and participate in someone else’s war".

Ukrainian officials denied involvement, saying it was either a Russian false flag attack or a case of Russians rebelling against their government. Ukrainian military officials said the Russian Volunteer Corps was an "independent" group. Ilya Ponomarev, political representative of the Freedom of Russia Legion, said the RVC has contacts with the Ukrainian military but operates in a "gray area".

See also 
Civic Council (Armed Forces of Ukraine)
National Republican Army (Russia)
Freedom of Russia Legion
Combat Organization of Anarcho-Communists
Rusich Group
Russian Imperial Movement

References 

Resistance during the 2022 Russian invasion of Ukraine
Foreign volunteer units resisting the 2022 Russian invasion of Ukraine
Military units and formations established in 2022
Neo-Nazism in Ukraine